Norman Sutton (11 January 1908 – 15 March 1999) was an English professional golfer. He tied for 6th place in the 1951 Open Championship and won the World Senior Championship in 1958.

Golf career
Sutton was an amateur with the West Cheshire Artisans and played in the 1927 Amateur Championship at Hoylake, aged 19. He beat Harold Hilton in the first round, William Breck Torrance in the second round  and Samuel Robinson in the third round. He lost in the fourth round, the last-32 stage, at the 19th hole to Captain Pearson, having been 2 up with 3 to play.

Sutton turned professional in early 1929, becoming an assistant at the Wentworth Club. He moved to Leigh Golf Club near Culcheth in 1932 where he stayed until moving to Exeter Golf and Country Club in 1952.

Tournament wins
1946 Leeds Cup, Penfold Tournament
1950 Daks Tournament, Penfold Tournament (with Joan Gee)
1951 Leeds Cup
1958 PGA Seniors Championship, World Senior Championship

Results in major championships

Note: Sutton only played in The Open Championship.

NT = No tournament
CUT = missed the half-way cut
"T" indicates a tie for a place

Team appearances
Canada Cup (representing England): 1955
Slazenger Trophy (representing Great Britain and Ireland): 1956 (winners)
Amateurs–Professionals Match (representing the Professionals): 1956 (winners)

References

English male golfers
Sportspeople from Birkenhead
1908 births
1999 deaths